This is a compilation of every international soccer game played by the United States men's national soccer team from 1990 through 1999. It includes the team's record for that year, each game and the date played. It also lists the U.S. goal scorers.

The format is: home team listed first, U.S. listed first at home or neutral site.

Records are in win–loss–tie format. Games decided in penalty kicks are counted as ties, as per the FIFA standard.

1990

1991

1992

1993

1994

1995

1996

1997

1998

1999

See also
1990 Croatia v United States soccer match
United States at the FIFA World Cup
United States at the FIFA Confederations Cup
United States at the CONCACAF Gold Cup
United States at the Copa América

External links
 USA - Details of International Matches 1990-1994
 USA - Details of International Matches 1995-1999
 U.S. SOCCER FEDERATION 2016 MEN’S NATIONAL TEAM MEDIA GUIDE

1990
1990 in American soccer
1991 in American soccer
1992 in American soccer
1993 in American soccer
1994 in American soccer
1995 in American soccer
1996 in American soccer
1997 in American soccer
1998 in American soccer
1999 in American soccer